Khenejin (also Romanized as Khenejīn, Khanājīn, Khānājin, Khanjīn, Khenjīn, Farahan , and Khon Jīn) is a city in Khenejin Rural District, in the Central District of Farahan County, Markazi Province, Iran. At the 2006 census, its population was 2,909, in 741 families. This city is populated by Azerbaijanians

References 

Populated places in Farahan County
Cities in Markazi Province